Elmira Township is located in Stark County, Illinois. As of the 2010 census, its population was 319 and it contained 158 housing units.

History
Elmira Township is named after Elmira, New York.

Geography

Demographics

References

External links
City-data.com
Illinois State Archives

Townships in Stark County, Illinois
Peoria metropolitan area, Illinois
Townships in Illinois